is the capital city of Ibaraki Prefecture, in the northern Kantō region of Japan. , the city had an estimated population of 269,330 in 123,282 households and a population density of 1239 persons per km2. The percentage of the population aged over 65 was 27.1%.

Geography
Mito is located in central Ibaraki Prefecture. Mito Station is about 10 km inland from the Pacific Ocean which Naka River, flowing from the north to the east of the city, pours into. Immediately south is Lake Senba, a recreational area. A main street extends from Mito Station to the west, and residential areas to the south and the west in particular.

Surrounding municipalities
Ibaraki Prefecture
 Hitachinaka
 Kasama
 Naka
 Ibaraki
 Ōarai
Shirosato

Climate
Mito has a Humid subtropical climate (Köppen Cfa) characterized by warm summers and cold winters with light snowfall.  The average annual temperature in Mito is 13.6 °C. The average annual rainfall is 1353.8 mm with September as the wettest month. The temperatures are highest on average in August, at around 25.2 °C, and lowest in January, at around 3.0 °C.

Demographics
Per Japanese census data, the population of Mito has steadily increased over the past century.

History

The Yamato people settled in Mito around the 4th century CE. Around the end of the Heian period, Baba Sukemoto, a warlord of the Heike clan, moved to Mito and built a castle there. Mito Castle changed hands several times after that; coming under the control of the Satake clan won it in Sengoku period, but the Satake were forced to surrender it to Tokugawa Ieyasu in 1603 after the Battle of Sekigahara. Ieyasu's son Tokugawa Yorifusa was then given Mito Castle, becoming head of one of the three "gosanke" branches of the clan qualified to provide a new shōgun should the main family line fail. During this period, Mito was the seat of the so-called Mito School, a congregation of nativist scholars of Confucian persuasion led by Aizawa Seishisai, who during the 18th and 19th centuries advocated Western learning as a means not only to further Japanese technological development and international strength, but as means to prove Japanese uniqueness and superiority among nations. The Kōdōkan was the largest of the han schools. The capital of Edo was directly connected to Mito by the Mito Kaidō. The Tokugawa ruled Mito until the Meiji Restoration.

The city of Mito was formed on April 1, 1889, with the establishment of the modern municipalities system. It was one of the first 31 cities to be established in Japan. With a population of 25,000, it was designated as the prefectural capital of Ibaraki Prefecture. By 1900, the Jōban Line connected Mito to Tokyo, and by 1910, telephones and electric lighting were available throughout the city. More than three-quarters of the city was burned to the ground during the Mito air raid of August 2, 1945, just before the end of World War II.

The borders of Mito expanded in 1955 through 1958 through the annexation of the neighboring villages of Kamiono, Watari, Yoshida, Sakedo, Kawawada, Yanagawa, Kunita and Iitomi and Akatsuka. The village of Tsunezumi was annexed in 1992. In 2001, Mito was designated a special city with increased local autonomy. The neighboring town of Uchihara was annexed in 2005. The city suffered from severe damage in the 2011 Tōhoku earthquake and tsunami with 25,982 houses completely or partially destroyed; however, there were only two fatalities.

Mito was designated a core city, with further increases in local autonomy on April 4, 2020.

Government
Mito has a mayor-council form of government with a directly elected mayor and a unicameral city council of 28 members. Mito contributes six members to the Ibaraki Prefectural Assembly. In terms of national politics, the city is divided between the Ibaraki 1st district and the  Ibaraki 2nd district of the lower house of the Diet of Japan.

Economy
Mito is primarily a regional commercial center and administrative city as most industry in Ibaraki is concentrated around the nearby cities of Tsukuba and Hitachi. Mito has a modest but thriving tourism industry, centered on the Kairaku-en gardens and local museums dedicated to the Tokugawa family.

Education
Ibaraki University
Tokiwa University
Tokiwa Junior College
Mito has 32 public elementary schools and 15 public middle schools operated by the city government, and one public elementary school and one public middle school operated by the national government. The city also has one private elementary school and two private middle schools. Mito  has seven public high school operated by the Ibaraki Prefectural Board of Education and seven private high schools, as well as one public and one private high school which offers only night and correspondence courses. The prefecture also operates six special education schools for the handicapped.
Ibaraki Korean Primary, Middle and High School, a North Korean school, is in the city.

Transportation

Railway
 JR East - Mito Line / Jōban Line
  -   -  - 
 JR East – Suigun Line
 
 Kashima Rinkai Railway Ōarai Kashima Line 
  -   -

Highway
  – Mito Interchange
  – Mito Minami Interchange
  – Mito-Oarai Interchange

Media
Ibaraki Shimbun
 Ibaraki Broadcast System

Local attractions
 Mito is the site of the Japanese garden Kairaku-en which is counted as one of the Three Great Gardens of Japan. Constructed by Tokugawa Nariaki in 1842, the park is known nationwide for its ume trees. Many people come to the park in spring to view the blossoms, particularly during the Ume Festival. In summer, Mito also holds the Mito Koumon Festival.
 Art Tower Mito
 Ibaraki Museum of Modern Art
 Ibaraki Prefectural Museum of History
 Kōdōkan School
 Lake Senba
 Mito Castle
 Mito Municipal Botanical Park
 Tokiwa Jinja

Professional sports

 Mito HollyHock, J. League
 Ibaraki Robots, B. League
 Malva FC, F. League

Sister city relations
 – Anaheim, California, United States, since December 21, 1976
 – Chongqing, China, friendship city since June 6, 2000
 – Tsuruga, Fukui, Japan, since October 10, 1964

Notable people
Yuko Suzuhana, musician
Yokoyama Taikan, artist
Nakamura Tsune, artist
Stomu Takeishi, musician
Aritomo Gotō, IJN admiral
Takeo Kurita, IJN admiral
Kinji Fukasaku, movie director
Takashi Koizumi, movie director
Teru Shimada, actor
Yutaka Nakajima, actor
Hiroyuki Watanabe, actor
Mika Katsumura, actress
Shin’ichirō Ikebe, musician
Mayumi Gojo, singer
Nobuo Tobita, voice actor
Megumi Nakajima, voice actress, singer
Azusa Tadokoro, voice actress, singer
Mitoizumi Masayuki, sumo wrestler (Sekiwake)
Musōyama Masashi, sumo wrestler (Ōzeki)
Miyabiyama Tetsushi, sumo wrestler (Ōzeki)
Takashi Yagihashi, chef
Sugiura Shigemine, World War 2 fighter pilot
Hitachiyama Taniemon, sumo wrestler (Yokozuna)

Gallery

References

External links

Official Website 
Public Interest Incorporated Foundation The Tokugawa Museum 

 
Cities in Ibaraki Prefecture
Populated places established in 1889
1889 establishments in Japan